At 5:20 pm PST (9:20 am UTC) on March 4, 2003, a bomb in a backpack exploded in the busy waiting area of Francisco Bangoy International Airport in Davao City, Philippines. It killed 21 people, injured over 100 others and caused substantial damage to the building.

The Islamic secessionist militant group Moro Islamic Liberation Front (MILF) is suspected of this bombing as well as other attacks. The MILF, who were one of the belligerents in the Moro conflict, demanding autonomy for the Moro people, said they were not the perpetrators.

See also
2016 Davao City bombing

References

21st century in Mindanao
Crime in Mindanao
History of Davao City